Captain is a 2018 Indian Malayalam-language biographical sports drama film written and directed by Prajesh Sen in his directorial debut. The film is about V. P. Sathyan, former captain of the India national football team, with Jayasurya portraying him. It also stars Anu Sithara, Renji Panicker, Siddique, Deepak Parambol, Saiju Kurup, Kamal Varadoor and Lakshmi Sharma. Jayasurya won the Kerala State Film Award for Best Actor for his performance in the film.

Cast
 Jayasurya as V. P. Sathyan, former Indian footballer
 Anu Sithara as Anitha Sathyan, wife of V.P Sathyan.
 Renji Panicker as Coach Jaffer, coach of Kerala Police football club.
 Siddique as Maithanam, a football enthusiast
 Saiju Kurup as Guptha IPS, senior officer of V.P Sathyan while he worked in Kerala Police Department.
 Deepak Parambol as U. Sharaf Ali, former Indian footballer, teammate of V.P Sathyan.
 Lakshmi Sharma as Sathyan's mother
 Janardhanan as K.Karunakaran, ex chief minister of Kerala
 Sreelatha Namboothiri as Anitha's grandmother
 Ambika Mohan as Anitha's mother
 Thalaivasal Vijay as SP Rajashekaran
Dhritiman Chatterjee as Mr. Sinha
 Santhosh Keezhattoor as Sathyan's elder brother
 Shaiju Damodaran as Sports Journalist (cameo appearance) and Football Commentator (voice only)
 Mammootty in cameo appearance as himself 
 Shiyas Kareem as South Korean Goalkeeper
 Nirmal Palazhi as Kittan
 Adwaith as V. P. Sathyan (Childhood)
 Anna A Smith as Athira, Sathyan's daughter
 Joby George Cameo appearance
 Akshaya as Sathyan's sister
 Nilja as Anitha's Friend
 Daya as Anitha (Childhood)

Production
Based on the life of former India national football team captain V. P. Sathyan, who, owning a good career history, committed suicide in 2006, Jayasurya announced the film in October 2016, with debutant Prajesh Sen as director and T. L. George of Goodwill Entertainments as producer. It began filming in early April 2017 in Kozhikode. A Santhosh Trophy match sequence was shot at Calicut University Stadium in Thenhipalam, during which Jayasurya injured his right leg, leading to a stay of filming for one week.

Music
Songs and score were composed by Gopi Sundar. The film's audio was released by minister K. T. Jaleel on 28 January 2018, by awarding it to Anitha Sathyan, V. P. Sathyan's wife. As part of the event, a football match between teams Golden 90s led by I. M. Vijayan and Captain Elevens led by Jayasurya was organised at the Safari Ground, Edappal, which was kicked off by C.K. Vineeth.

References

External links
 

2018 films
Indian sports drama films
Indian association football films
Indian films based on actual events
Sports films based on actual events
Biographical films about sportspeople
Indian biographical drama films
Cultural depictions of Indian men
Films about suicide
2010s Malayalam-language films